The Frederick Weistar House is a historic stone cottage house at 515 Chestnut Street in Chester, Illinois. The house was built circa 1859 for Frederick Weistar, a Swiss immigrant. The house has a vernacular design with a two-door facade pattern, in which two front doors provided access to each of the house's two first-floor rooms. The house itself was two rooms wide and one room deep which provided access to most of the house. While the two-door facade is common in vernacular architecture, the purpose of the two doors is historically disputed; as the form is especially prevalent in German vernacular architecture, it may have been inspired by traditional German architecture, though it may have also functioned as a way to separate public and private spaces in a home. This particular design of house was very popular for single-family residences. The one-story limestone house also features a wooden front porch with carved columns and brackets, its only significant decorative element.

On the outside front of the house remains a plaque that states "Stone Cottage 1850 on Lot 20 deeded to John & Samuel Lybarger Descendants of Revolutionary War Patriots Ludwick Lybarger and Jean Baptiste Montreuil". The house allows visitors to see a more modest Family home that was built in the mid 1800s to get a better understanding of life during this time period.

The house was added to the National Register of Historic Places (#100002573) on June 15, 2018; its name was misspelled "Frederick Weister House" in its listing. The house is also apart of the Randolph County Museum.

References

National Register of Historic Places in Randolph County, Illinois
Houses on the National Register of Historic Places in Illinois
Houses completed in 1859